is a public university at Hashima, Gifu, Japan, established in 2000.

External links
 Official website

Educational institutions established in 2000
Public universities in Japan
Universities and colleges in Gifu Prefecture
Nursing schools in Japan
Hashima, Gifu
2000 establishments in Japan